Phrom Phong station is a BTS Skytrain station, on the Sukhumvit Line between Khlong Toei and Watthana Districts, Bangkok, Thailand. The station is on Sukhumvit Road at Soi Phrom Phong (Soi Sukhumvit 39). The area is a popular shopping destination, and the station is linked by skybridge to EmQuartier and The Emporium shopping malls with urban green space Benjasiri Park.

See also
 Bangkok Skytrain

BTS Skytrain stations